The Battle of Kandahar began on 9 July 2021, as Taliban insurgents assaulted the city to capture it from the Afghan National Security Forces (ANSF). After heavy fighting for weeks the city's defenses had started to dissolve in August. This allowed the Taliban to enter and overrun most of the city on 12 August 2021, including the Sarposa prison, which included the release of over 1,000 prisoners, and ultimately the capture of the city. However, the siege for the nearby airport continued, where government loyalists held out until being evacuated on 16 August.

Background
Kandahar, the second-largest city of Afghanistan and the capital of Kandahar Province, was a heavily defended city guarded by Afghan National Army (ANA) forces. However, amidst the 2021 Taliban offensive, the Taliban had led brutal attacks on the city, wearing down the defenses and causing many to desert and flee due to fear of being captured by the Taliban. Kandahar continued to be held by a mixed garrison of regular army soldiers, special police, and commandos.

Simultaneously with the withdrawal of most United States troops from Afghanistan, the Taliban attacks had been ferocious, with many provincial capitals falling to the group, ANA forces had to concentrate elsewhere, weakening the defenses of the city. These combined had allowed the Taliban to capture many surrounding districts of Kandahar, including Spin Boldak, Panjwai, and Zhari.

Battle
The battle for the city began on 9 July 2021, as Taliban militants began to raid the urban areas in Kandahar's Seventh Police District and seized several houses. The militants were mainly opposed by commandos and other special forces. The commandos were forced to transfer prisoners from Kandahar prison to prevent an outbreak. The government forces' ability to repulse Taliban infiltrators was hampered by the presence of civilians caught in the crossfire. By mid-July, heavy clashes took place across the city, forcing over 11,000 families to move from Kandahar into refugee camps. The Taliban also captured Kandahar District (also called Dand District), where Kandahar's airport was located. The airport remained government-held, however, allowing the Afghan Air Force to continue its bombing raids on the advancing rebels. However, these aerial attacks had little effect. In response to the unabated rebel attacks, the government imposed a curfew on the city on 16 July, while sending more commandos to assist the defense of Kandahar.

Despite these reinforcements, the insurgents steadily captured more police districts, pushing the government loyalists towards the city center. The Afghan Air Force, assisted by the United States Air Force, continued to bomb the Taliban to no avail. By 22 July 2021, Kandahar was being essentially besieged by the rebels. All surrounding districts save for Daman District had fallen under Taliban control, and only Kandahar's air field remained under full government control. According to the FDD's Long War Journal, the potential fall of Daman District to the insurgents would make it extremely difficult for the government forces to hold onto Kandahar city. At some point in late July, rebels captured Nazar Mohammad in Kandahar, a popular comedian known for his opposition to the Taliban. The insurgents murdered him. Afghan Intelligence agency, National Directorate of Security (NDS), had also arrested four Afghan journalists in Kandahar. Their arrested was condemned by Amnesty International and other watchdog organisations.

Khalil Ahmad Mujahid, a lawmaker from Kandahar, accused the government of not paying attention to the situation in the province. He blamed the favouritism in appointment of security officials in Kandahar as the reason for collapse of districts in the province.

In early August 2021, the Taliban besiegers were strengthened by reinforcements, allowing them to increase their pressure and forcing the government to send even more troops to hold onto Kandahar. A major attack on the city center was repelled by the commandos with aerial assistance. The Taliban consequently focused on the airport, bombarding it with rockets to reduce the Afghan Air Force's ability to intervene in the fighting. As the city was destroyed by the fighting, the government advised all civilians to evacuate on 5 August 2021. As the battle for Kandahar raged, however, the government was increasingly pressured in other parts of the country as well. Taliban armies captured Herat and Kunduz as a part of their offensive in August. 

The government failed to properly supply the besieged troops in Kandahar. The defenders were suffering from a lack of weapons as well as ammunition, while troops deserted to protect their families in rural districts recently overrun by Taliban. Most important, however, was the lack of food. For weeks, local policemen only received half-rotten potatoes; worn down by constant fighting and fed up with the catastrophic food rations, morale in one police unit broke on 11 August. The loyalists' defenses at Kandahar prison then collapsed, allowing the insurgents to free hundreds of inmates and depriving the government of a crucial stronghold, and swelling the attackers' numbers as they enlisted the ex-prisoners. The prison's fall made a continued defense of the city extremely difficult. Local leaders also pressured the governor and military commanders to accept a Taliban ultimatum to retreat. At this point, the frontlines across the city began to fall apart. New York Times reporters consequently argued that the failure of Kandahar's defense ultimately "came down to potatoes". 

By late 12 August 2021, Taliban had broken through most of the defensive positions, whereupon the government forces mostly retreated to the governor's palace. In the next hours, most policemen and commandos fled the city, allowing the Taliban to enter Kandahar and solidify their rule in the region. The governor's palace was initially still held by the elite Unit 03, but these troops retreated after being called by the city's governor who informed them that he had agreed to surrender Kandahar to the Taliban. Many soldiers surrendered after the Taliban promised to not harm them; these troops were consequently issued with documents to get through rebel checkpoints and peacefully leave the city. In contrast, the rebels reportedly began to round up civil servants in Kandahar.

However, remants of the garrison continued to hold onto Kandahar Airport after the city had fallen, including Unit 03. Commanded by Lt. Col. Mohammad Iqbal Nuristani, these troops remained besieged by the insurgents. Iqbal called upon the government, U.S. American military officers, and the Central Intelligence Agency to aid the besieged troops. The defenders hoped to evacuated by air. On 14 August, Lockheed C-130 Hercules transport planes arrived to begin rescuing the remaining troops at the airport, while the rebels continued to bombard it with mortars. Not all could be flown out at once; Nuristani consequently coordinated the evacuation, taking the first flight to Kabul and then returning to Kandahar Airport to help his remaining men. By 15 August, the besieged soldiers were almost out of ammunition and water. That day, they were informed of the capture of Kabul and collapse of the Afghan government. The Taliban gave the airport's defenders a final ultimatum, stating that they could surrender until midnight or die fighting. The besieged troops also ran out of ammunition, but did not surrender; they were rescued on 16 August by Unit 03 soldiers who personally organized aircraft at the U.S.-defended Kabul Airport to evacuate them.

Aftermath
With Kandahar city secured, the Taliban continued their campaigns of focusing on the shift towards capturing provincial capitals from the Afghan government as a part of their 2021 offensive. Having taken rural Afghanistan, they focused on more urban parts, with many cities taken over by them.

The Taliban victory had increased the number of provincial capitals under their control to 13, and foreshadowed the rapid collapse of the Afghan government and Fall of Kabul.

Reaction from locals
The take over of Kandahar was welcomed by many locals. Hundreds of locals took their motorbikes to the streets to celebrate the takeover of Kandahar by the Taliban. Residents of Kandahar said that shops and markets in Kandahar are open and the situation is now totally normal with people allowed to visit other part of the province without constraint.

Significance
Kandahar is the second largest city of Afghanistan and one of the most strategic, as a key hub to the south of the country. The capture of Kandahar is expected to give the Taliban a major morale boost, as the movement was founded in the city in 1994 during the 1992–1996 Afghan Civil War.

See also
2021 Taliban offensive
Capture of Zaranj
Battle of Kunduz
Fall of Herat
Battle of Lashkargah
Fall of Kabul

References

2021 in Afghanistan
21st century in Kandahar Province
Kandahar
Kandahar
July 2021 events in Asia
August 2021 events in Afghanistan